The Ezzolied,  also known as the Cantilena de miraculis Christi (Song of the miracles of Christ) or the Anegenge (Beginning),  is an early Middle High German poem written by Ezzo, a German scholar and priest of Bamberg. It dates to the 1060s.

The subject of the poem is the life of Jesus Christ. Very popular during the later Middle Ages, the Ezzolied had a great influence on the poetry of Southern Germany, and is valuable as a monument of the poetical literature of the time.

It survives in two recensions, associated with Strasbourg and Vorau. The poem was found by Barack in a Strasbourg manuscript of the late 11th century; but only a few strophes are given. The whole song consists of 34 strophes in a later version, the Vorau manuscript. The poem is written in the East Franconian dialect; it relates in earnest language the creation, fall, and redemption of mankind. It was edited by P. Piper and Steinmayer (in Müllenhoff and Scherer "Denkmäler deutscher Poesie und Prosa aus dem VIII-XII Jahrhundert", Berlin, 1892).

The "Vita Altmanni" relates that in 1065, when rumours of the approaching end of the world were rife, many people started on a pilgrimage to Jerusalem under the leadership of Bishop Gunther of Bamberg, and that Ezzo composed the poem on this occasion. The opening strophe of the Vorau manuscript does not mention the pilgrimage, but simply states that the bishop ordered Ezzo to write the song. The effect, we are told, was such that everybody hastened to take monastic vows.

References

11th-century poems
Medieval German poems
Depictions of Jesus in literature